Maurice Carpentier (22 June 1921 – 4 May 2011) was a French racing cyclist. He rode in the 1948 Tour de France.

References

External links
 

1921 births
2011 deaths
French male cyclists
People from Bolbec
Sportspeople from Seine-Maritime
Cyclists from Normandy